Greek passports are issued to Greek citizens for the purpose of international travel. Biometric passports have been issued since 26 August 2006, with old-style passports being declared invalid as of 1 January 2007. Since June 2009, the passport's RFID chip includes two index fingerprints as well as a high-resolution JPEG image of the passport holder. Every Greek citizen is also a citizen of the European Union. The passport, along with the national identity card allows for free rights of movement and residence in any of the states of the European Union, European Economic Area, and Switzerland.

Passport appearance
The Greek passport follows the standard European Union passport design, with a burgundy red cover and the national emblem emblazoned on the centre of the front cover. The word ΔΙΑΒΑΤΗΡΙΟ (Greek for "passport") is inscribed below the coat of arms, while ΕΥΡΩΠΑΪΚΗ ΕΝΩΣΗ ("European Union") and ΕΛΛΗΝΙΚΗ ΔΗΜΟΚΡΑΤΙΑ ("Hellenic Republic") appear above. A Greek diplomatic passport has the same size and design as the standard one, but it features a black cover and the text ΔΙΠΛΩΜΑΤΙΚΟ ΔΙΑΒΑΤΗΡΙΟ ("diplomatic passport") inscribed below the coat of arms. Greek passports contain 32 pages and are valid for 10 years.

All fields on the bearer's page are indicated in Greek and in English, with the translation in the other EU-languages elsewhere in the passport. The main information of the bearer (name and place of birth) are transcribed from the Greek to the Latin script, according to ELOT 743 scheme. The following fields are shown:
Type (P for Passport)
Passport number
Country [ΕΛΛ/GRC]
Surname [Greek/Latin script)
Name [Greek/Latin script)
Nationality [ΕΛΛΗΝΙΚΗ/Hellenic]
Date of Birth [Latin script]
Place of birth [Greek/Latin script]
Sex [M/F]
Issue Date [Latin script]
Expiry Date [Latin script]
Issuing Office [Greek/Latin script]
Height
The bearer's page contains a machine readable strip starting with P<GRC.

Security features
The latest version of Greek passport meets international standards as defined by the International Civil Aviation Organization (ICAO). New features include secure lamination (O.V.D.), color-shifting ink (O.V.I.), pages with intricate designs, microtext, watermarks, security threads, images visible only with ultraviolet light, raised (intaglio) printing, and a chip. The data stored on the chip are protected by using advanced digital encryption techniques.

Issuing process
Greek passports are issued by the National Passport Centre ("Διεύθυνση Διαβατηρίων/Αρχηγείο Ελληνικής Αστυνομίας"). Applicants have to apply in personin case of a child under 14, accompanied by a parentat the local police department or at a Greek Consulate Authority. Upon submitting all the requirements (special portrait photo, issuing request, and fee), the police department begins the issuing procedure. All passports are manufactured centrally at the N.P.C main building in Athens. Depending on the circumstances, passports are issued in 3 to 9 business days and must be picked up at the police department in which the issuing request was made. For this, an applicant must carry with her/him a special receipt they received after applying. Standard passports are valid for a period of 10 years for people 14 years old and older, and 3 years for children under 14 (after the official edition of the 135th Presidential decree in 2007).

Greek passports cannot be extended. A holder has to make a request for a new one if his/her passport expires within the next six months of the request and he/she plans to use it after the expiry date.

The issuing of a standard adult passport costs €84.40, while that of a child costs €73.60. Reissuance of an existing and still-valid passport with no blank pages is possible with a validity date equal to the previous passport and a cost of €53.

Visa free travel

Visa requirements for Greek citizens are administrative entry restrictions by the authorities of other states placed on citizens of Greece. As of 3 July 2018, Greek citizens had visa-free or visa-on-arrival access to 183 countries and territories, ranking the Greek passport 6th in the world according to the Visa Restrictions Index (tied with the Australian passport). Additionally, Arton Capital's Passport Index ranked the Greek passport 3rd in the world in terms of travel freedom, with a visa-free score of 162 (tied with Austrian, Belgian, Canadian, Irish, Malaysian and Portuguese passports), as of 3 July 2018.

Gallery of passports

See also

Greek identity card
Visa requirements for Greek citizens
Visa policy of the Schengen Area
Greek nationality law
Passports of the European Union

References

External links
Greek passport on PRADO
Video presentations of the new Greek biometric passport
Information from the Greek Foreign Ministry

Passports by country
Government of Greece
European Union passports